Judith Lynn McConnell (born April 6, 1944) is an American actress, best known for her role as Sophia Wayne Capwell on the TV series Santa Barbara, on which she appeared from 1984 to 1993.

Early life and education
McConnell was born in Pittsburgh, Pennsylvania, and attended Carnegie Mellon University. She was Miss Pennsylvania for 1965 and competed in the 1966 Miss America pageant.

Career 
McConnell started her acting career in an episode of Judd, for the Defense (1967). Around the same time, she played Yeoman Tankris in Star Trek episode "Wolf in the Fold" (also 1967).

She appeared in an episode of  Get Smart called The King Lives (January 1968) as Princess Marta. She later played short-term recurring roles on The Beverly Hillbillies (1969) as a bank secretary and Green Acres (as Eb's girlfriend) in the 1970-71 season. She played Betsy Nicholls in an episode of Dragnet (1970) and in the TV serie Mannix (Season 4 Episode 06: The Lost Art Of Dying).

Prior to her stints as Valerie Conway on As the World Turns from 1976 to 1979 and as Sophia Capwell on Santa Barbara, McConnell played Nurse Augusta McLeod on General Hospital from 1973 to 1975. Her character murdered longtime GH villain Phil Brewer which aired December 6, 1974 after he threatened her in regards to her unborn child fathered by the married Dr. Peter Taylor. She appeared in the Sliders episode (5/15) "To Catch a Slide" (1999).

Moving to New York, McConnell took on the role of scheming Valerie Conway on As the World Turns, and later played socialite Miranda Bishop on Another World. A brief role as spy Eva Vasquez on One Life to Live came about in 1983, after which she moved back to Los Angeles to replace Rosemary Forsyth on Santa Barbara.

McConnell has guest-starred on numerous television series throughout the years and some films. She has appeared in a commercial for IKEA, in The Weather Man (2005), and as the elderly auctioneer in The Purge: Anarchy.

Filmography

Film

Television

References

External links

1944 births
Living people
American soap opera actresses
Miss America 1960s delegates
Actresses from Pittsburgh
20th-century American people
21st-century American women